The  is a railway line in Japan operated by the private railway operator Hankyu Railway. It connects Osaka-umeda Station in Osaka and Kyoto-kawaramachi Station in Kyoto.

Definition

Officially, the Kyoto Main Line is from Jūsō to Kyoto-kawaramachi, however, all trains run beyond Jūsō to Osaka-umeda terminal, using the eastern tracks of the section exclusively. Hankyu treats the Kyoto Main Line in the same way as the passengers do, i.e. as the line between Osaka-umeda and Kyoto-kawaramachi (except for special circumstances such as governmental procedures).

History

The Kyoto Main Line was constructed in the following phases:
 1 April 1, 1921: Jūsō – Awaji (by Kita-Osaka Electric Railway)
 16 January 1928: Awaji – Takatsuki-machi (present-day Takatsuki-shi) (by Shin-Keihan Railway)
 1 November 1928: Takatsuki-machi – Kyoto-Saiin (present-day Saiin) (by Shin-Keihan Railway)
 31 March 1931: Saiin – Keihan-Kyoto (present-day Ōmiya) (by Keihan Electric Railway)
 18 February 1959: The additional double tracks of the Takarazuka Main Line between Umeda (present-day Osaka-umeda) and Jūso now used exclusively by the Kyoto Main Line
 17 June 1963: Ōmiya – Kawaramachi (now Kyoto-kawaramachi)

Prior to the merger of Hankyu Railway (then Hanshin Kyūkō Railway) and Keihan Electric Railway in 1943, the line and its branches were owned by the latter and called the Shin-Keihan (New Keihan) Line. In the breakup of the merger in 1949, the line was not ceded to Keihan and became a competitor of the Keihan Main Line.

Construction has been in progress since 2012 to elevate a  section of track from Sōzenji Station to Kami-Shinjō Station including the junction with the Senri Line at Awaji Station. Originally projected for a 2020 completion, various delays have pushed back the start of operations on the new tracks to 2031.

Station numbering was introduced to all Hankyu stations on 21 December 2013.

On 17 December 2022 the name of the "Rapid Express" was changed to "Semi Express" with no changes to the stop pattern. This was done in anticipation for the future implementation of seat reservation services.

Proposed connecting line
A loop line from Juso to Awaji via Shin-Osaka station, to provide a direct connection to the Shinkansen has been proposed, but is not currently scheduled for construction.

Service types

Regular operations 
In the timetable revised on December 21, 2013, regular trains are classified as follows:

Through service: All-stations "Local" trains operate between Osaka-umeda and Kita-Senri (on the Senri Line, connected at Awaji) and between Takatsuki-shi and Tengachaya (on the Osaka Metro Sakaisuji Line, via the Senri Line).

Operated on weekday rush hours, Saturdays and holidays
Through service: Sakaisuji Semi-Express trains operate between Kyoto-kawaramachi or Takatsuki-shi and Tengachaya.

 Rush hours only.
Officially referred to as Rapid Service in English.

 Rush hours only.
This service type will be renamed  effective 17 December 2022.

 Operated on off-peak hours.

 Weekdays rush hours only.

 & .

Weekends only, collectively known as the 
The Rapid Limited Express A will be suspended effective 17 December 2022.

Extra services 

  
 Osaka-umeda - Arashiyama: ""
Kyoto-kawaramachi - Arashiyama: ""
 - Through services to Arashiyama Line, Osaka Metro Sakaisuji Line, Takarazuka Main Line and the Kobe Main Line.
Kosoku Kobe - Arashiyama: ""
Takarazuka - Arashiyama (via the Imazu Line): ""
Tengachaya - Arashiyama: "" (seasonal service)
On the Kyoto Main Line, these extra limited express stop at the same stations as the regular Rapid Limited Express.

Stations
Legends:

 ● : Trains stop.
 | : Trains pass.

Local trains stop at all stations.

Thus, in operation, Nakatsu Station is not listed on the Kyoto Line.

The starting point of the distances (km) shown is Jūsō Station, which is officially the starting point of the Kyoto Main Line.

Rolling stock

 1300 series EMU (from 30 March 2014)
 3300 series EMU
 5300 series EMU
 6300 series EMU (Kyō-Train)
 7000 series EMU (Kyō-Train Garaku)
 7300 series EMU
 8300 series EMU
 9300 series EMU
 Osaka Municipal Subway 66 series (Awaji - Takatsuki-shi)

Former
 1300 series EMU (1957)
 2000 series EMU (Temporary)
 2300 series EMU
 2800 series EMU
 5100 series EMU (Temporary)
 Osaka Municipal Subway 60 series EMU (Awaji - Takatsuki-shi)

References
This article incorporates material from the corresponding article in the Japanese Wikipedia

 
Kyoto
Rail transport in Kyoto Prefecture
Rail transport in Osaka Prefecture
Railway lines opened in 1921
Standard gauge railways in Japan